Noah's Ark (officially Noah's Ark Family Park Inc.) is the largest outdoor water park in the United States. It features 51 water slides and dozens of various attractions. The park is located in the village of Lake Delton, Wisconsin.

History 
In 1979, the Waterman family purchased  of frontage property on U.S. Route 12 in Wisconsin Dells, Wisconsin and created a bumper boat ride and built a go-kart track, which replaced the Delton Outdoor Theatre, the area's drive-in theater. The park opened as "Noah's Incredible Adventure," which became the name of a Noah's Ark attraction in 2003. In 1994, the Gantz family of Dubuque, Iowa, purchased Noah's Ark and added the "OctoExplorer", a yellow submarine with moving periscope, water guns and soft-surfaced waterslides. In 2003, Noah's Ark Waterpark celebrated 25 years of operation. In 2012, the park was purchased by Palace Entertainment.
While under the ownership of Palace Entertainment, six attractions have been closed and three have been added. Other changes include fencing the park's perimeter, removing per-use lockers, and instituting parking fees. During this ownership, the park has seen numerous general park infrastructure upgrades such as a bathroom, restaurant, store remodels, a 400-person dormitory for employees, an employee cafeteria, a convenience store, and new Human Resources offices.

An electrical fire destroyed the iconic ark structure at the front of the park in 2012. Originally a ticket office, the ark was being used as a museum and storage facility at the time of the fire. A new ark was built in homage to the original ark on top of the Flash Flood splash bridge.

On March 13, 2020, the park was closed due to the COVID-19 pandemic lockdown. It opened later on June 20, 2020, but closed early on August 1, 2020, for the rest of the season after two employees tested positive for the virus.

Rides 
It takes 5 million gallons to fill the pools and 3 miles of waterslides. Its lifeguards earned the Platinum Award from Jeff Ellis and Associates Inc. (2006, 2017), the highest waterpark safety rating possible.

Waterslides 
Toucan Twister (1985) – 3 adult bodyslides and 2 child slides.
Technetic Industries Slide-A-Ride
Previously named Slidewinder (1985–2017)
Originally opened with four slides (2 adult and 2 child)
Expanded in 1986 adding the left most adult slide (currently orange)
The Bermuda Triangle (1988) – Three tube slides
Monkey Rapids (1989) – Three tube slides that empty into Adventure River.
Previously named Bahama Falls (1989–2017)
Congo Bongo (1991) – Proslide Mammoth family raft ride with turns 
 More than 100 pieces of fiberglass, each costing $3,000 a piece
 Total cost was 1.3 million
 700 feet long
 Uses 600,000 gallons per hour
 Tube conveyor was added in 1994
Kowabunga (1993) – One Proslide TurboMammoth and one BubbaTub from WaterWorld Products
Family raft speed slides that go down without turns.
 Two similar family raft rides each featuring three bumps
 Oddity in that the two slides are essentially the same ride, just by two different manufacturers side-by-side
Black Thunder (1995) – Proslide Pipeline, two-person or single tube slides in the dark.
Consisting of two TurboPIPElines (Witches Gulch) and two PIPElines (Twin Twisters)
Flying Gecko (1997) – Proslide Mammoth family raft ride in the dark.
Previously named Dark Voyage (1995–2017)
Point of No Return (2001) – 10-story-tall Proslide speedslide that takes riders 4 seconds to descend. 
Opened as two side-by-side slides, however, one of the slides was taken down and replaced with Scorpion's Tail.
The bottom runout remains the same
Sting Ray (2002) – Two large halfpipes from Water Fun Products
Replaced Tank Tag
  Black Anaconda (2005) – Proslide  Rocket Water Coaster
  First Generation Proslide water coaster, uses conveyor belts instead of magnets or water in Proslide's later water coasters
  One of America's longest watercoasters
  Replaced Thunder Rapids Tube Ride
Time Warp (2006) – Proslide BehemothBowl 60
The world's largest bowl ride
It is a clone of the former Disco H2O at Wet n Wild (which closed in 2016).
Scorpion's Tail (2010) – Whitewater West AquaLoop
America's first upside-down looping body slide
Drops riders down from a trap door in a capsule into an almost inverted loop
Replaced a Point of No Return Slide
Quadzilla (2012) – Proslide Kraken Racer
Four braided head-first slides
Replaced The Plunge
Raja (2018) – Polin King Cobra
Replaced Bumper Boats

Wave pools 
The Wave (1987) – Wavetek Wave Pool
 It was with this addition that Noah's Ark became America's Largest Waterpark
 Opened as the largest wave pool in the Midwest and sixth largest in the country
 Has capability of producing eight different types of waves
Big Kahuna (1989) – Wavetek Wave Pool
Once the largest wave pool in Wisconsin Dells, now eclipsed by Mt. Olympus's Surf Pool
 As of 2015, it cost $1,500 a day to make the waves

Lazy Rivers 
Endless River (1985) – Simple Lazy River
 Thought to be the first in the Midwest and fourth in the world upon opening
 Originally known as Lazy River and was 1/4 of a mile, stretching around only Toucan Twisters
 Expanded in 1986 to 1/3 of a mile, stretching to the splash pool of Bermuda Triangle when it would be installed
 This created the only figure 8 lazy river in the country
 Was simplified to current oval shape in 2006 when Time Warp was installed
Adventure River (1989)
Originally featured small waves and rapids

Other Attractions 
Paradise Lagoon (1984) – An activity pool 
Features slides (Chutes and Motels), zip-lines, and a water walk
Motel slide manufactured by Aquaslide
OctoExplorer (1994) – Children's play area made by NBGS
 Marketed as "A Yellow Submarine with Moving Periscope, Water Geysers, Interactive Play Equipment and Soft Slides" from the manufacturer
 Repainted and refurbished in 2016
Flash Flood (1999) – Hopkins Rides Shoot the Chute. 
20-passenger boat that descends a  drop into a large pool; includes bridge observation area which gets hit by the subsequent wall of water.
Noah's 4-D Dive-In Theater (2007) – Midwest's Largest 4-D Theater
Currently Standing but Not Operating, status is unknown
Tadpole Bay Kiddie Kingdom (2008) – SCS Interactive children's play area 
Features Noah's Ark theme, 4 kiddie waterslides, over 50 water features, and an 800-gallon bucket dump.
Surfing Safari (2013) – Single FlowRider stationary surf attraction
Replaced portions of land that Jungle Rapids once stood

Former attractions 
Can-Am Race Cars (1979)
Removed in 1998 and replaced by Flash Flood
Bumper Boats (1979) – First Attraction Built At Noah's Ark
Taken out in 2018, replaced by Raja.
Jungle Rapids (1980) – Five Tube and mat slides 
Technetic Industries Slide-A-Ride
Originally opened with three slides, with two additional slides opening in 1982
The parks oldest water attraction
First fiberglass waterslide in the area
Mostly closed as of the 2012 season.
Two of the four of the highest slides remained open for the 2012 season
For the 2013 the entire complex was demolished
Portions replaced by Surfing Safari
Miniature Golf (1980) – 18 holes. 
Reopened in the 2019 season.
Currently standing but not operating, status is unknown
Thunder Rapids (1982) – Three interweaving hillside concrete tube chute style rides
 Originally two tube chutes with an additional run opening in 1984
 One was removed when Point of No Return was installed
 Other two were removed for Black Anaconda
 Referred to as Mountain Mania Innertube Ride on a brochure from the early 1980s
 Baja Racers (1983? ) - Off Road Go Karts
 Removed in 1984? for Paradise Lagoon
 Dune Cats (1983?) - Off Road Go Karts
 Removed in 1984? for Paradise Lagoon
 The Plunge (1984) – two belly-down, face first racing mat slides.
 Technetic Industries Bonzi
 Replaced by Quadzilla in 2012
 Referred to as Bonzi Water Slide on a brochure from the early 1980s
 Bonzi, however, is the slide type and it is believed these brochures were printed before The Plunge name was selected
Kiddie Bumper Boats (1987)
Located next to The Wave
Replaced with Hooligan's Harbor RC Boats in 2018
Manufactured by World Famous Kiddie Bumper Boats
Kiddie Race Cars (1987) 
Removed in 1998 and replaced by Flash Flood
King of the Mountain (1987)
Several play structures for children which were slowly removed from kiddie areas
Tank Tag (1989) – a game where participants shoot tennis balls at targets for points from stationary guns, and mobile tanks.
Taken down in 2001 and replaced with the Sting Ray.
Go Gator (1990?) Wisdom kiddie roller coaster. 
Closed in 2012
Noah's Incredible Adventure (2003) – Mack Mystery Swing
A high-capacity, dry amusement ride which involved a large "Mystery Swing" and special visual effects to recreate a journey on Noah's famous ark. 
Utilizes a Technifex Evolator to simulate an elevator through Earth's crust
It was replaced by Curse of the Crypt in the same building in 2009.
SpongeBob SquarePants 4-D (2007) – featured at Noah's Dive-In Theater from 2007 to 2011. Was replaced with Pirates 4-D. Pirates 4-D replaced by “Ice Age 4-D” in 2015. In 2017 the ride was made into “The LEGO Movie The 4-D Experience”
Curse of the Crypt (2009) – Mack Rides Mystery Swing.
Rethemed version of Noah's Incredible Adventure
Closed in 2012, standing but not operating
Utilizes a Technifex Evolator

References

External links 
 

1979 establishments in Wisconsin
Water parks in Wisconsin
Wisconsin Dells, Wisconsin
Palace Entertainment
Noah's Ark in popular culture